Schicksalsmelodien (German for "Melodies of Destiny") is the eighth studio album by German rock band Eisbrecher. It is a cover album of songs that influenced Eisbrecher members in their youth.

Track listing 

 Track 12 had previously been released as part of the Compilation Album Ewiges Eis – 15 Jahre Eisbrecher.
 Track 13 had previously been released on the Special Edition of the Schock album.
 Track 14 had previously been released as a B Side on the "Volle Kraft voraus" Single.

Music videos 
 "Skandal im Sperrbezirk"1
 "Out of the Dark"2

Charts

Weekly charts

Year-end charts

References

External links
 Official band website

Eisbrecher albums
2020 albums
German-language albums